Waterside Plaza is a residential and business complex located on the East River in the Kips Bay section of Manhattan, New York City. It was formerly a Mitchell-Lama Housing Program-funded rental project.

History
Waterside Plaza was built on landfill brought to the US as ships' ballast from the rubble of the city of Bristol in the UK, which was bombed by the Luftwaffe in World War II during the Bristol Blitz.  The apartment buildings, as well as the neighboring United Nations International School, were constructed on top of platforms supported by over 2,000 concrete piles sunk into the East River. Developed by Richard Ravitch, the first apartment buildings opened in 1973 and the complex was completed the following year. The housing development received the Construction Achievement Project of the Year Award from the Metropolitan Section of the American Society of Civil Engineers in 1974. There were plans to build additional above-water apartments, offices, and a hotel in the 1980s, but environmental concerns and community opposition doomed the project.

In 2004, Waterside Management Company LLC launched a three-year capital improvement program with a cost in excess of $35 million. The capital improvement program included upgrades to all new apartments as they became vacant as well as all hallways and each building's reception and concierge areas. The plaza itself was re-waterproofed and repaved and extensive park-like landscaping added. The health club, parking facilities, and security system were also upgraded.

Features
The complex is made up of four residential towers as well as a row of duplex townhouses, clad in red brickwork, that encompass a large plaza overlooking the East River. There are 1,470 residential units along with a health club (open to non-residents) and a parking garage.  Waterside Plaza's small retail space is occupied by a dry cleaners, a stationery store, Xia Nails and Spa, Creative Dream Parties, a Gristedes supermarket, and Robbins Nest Cafe. The British International School of New York also rents several large commercial spaces in the complex. The United Nations International School is next to Waterside.

Waterside is accessible to vehicles only by entering from 23rd Street. Cars and trucks leaving Waterside can do so through 23rd Street or driving along a service road to 34th Street. A footbridge at East 25th Street allows safe passage across the FDR Drive to the west. Waterside also contains the first two stops on the M34A Select Bus Service route.

Waterside is Manhattan's only residential complex located east of the FDR Drive.  The East River Greenway passes between the two. The waterfront south of Waterside Plaza, Stuyvesant Cove Park, which is part of the Greenway, includes a small manmade land mass extending out into the East River, which was created from excess cement dumped into the river.

Architectural significance 
Waterside Plaza was designed by the architecture firm of Davis, Brody & Associates. In 2001, The New York Times architectural critic Herbert Muschamp described Waterside as a "great urban composition" that is "picturesque and historically informed."

In 1975, Waterside won the Albert S. Bard Award for Distinguished Architecture and Urban Design. A year later, it won an Honor Award from the American Institute of Architects. In 2004, the Municipal Art Society placed Waterside on its "30 Under 30", a watch list of future landmarks.

Events
Waterside Plaza hosts year-round events that are free and open to the public. The most popular are the outdoor summer concerts in July and the outdoor Monday night movies in August.

In 2008, Waterside Plaza hosted the Make Music New York festival, during which 17 bands performed concerts on three different stages - on the waterside, in the gardens, and on the plaza. Other events include monthly playreadings, a short play festival, a dance festival, a spring flea market, and an electronic recycling day.

Notable events include P. F. Chang's holding of a charity event on the roof of one of Waterside's high rise buildings on June 28, 2010, during which professional golfers Annika Sörenstam, Briny Baird and Don Vickery took turns driving golf balls at a target floating in the East River. The event raised a total of $100,000 for several charities including the Intrepid Fallen Heroes Fund.

References

External links

Living at Waterside YouTube Video

Housing in New York City
Neighborhoods in Manhattan
Kips Bay, Manhattan
East River
Residential buildings completed in 1972
Brutalist architecture in New York City
Residential skyscrapers in Manhattan